In Greek mythology, Everes or Eueres (Ancient Greek: Εὐήρους or Εὐήρης "well-fitted") may refer to the following characters:

 Everes, the Theban father, by the nymph Chariclo, of Tiresias. He may be a descendant of Udaeus, one of the Spartoi.
 Everes, an Arcadian son of Heracles and Parthenope, daughter of King Stymphalus of Arcadia.
 Everes, a Taphian prince who was the only one to survive among the sons of King Pterelaus of Taphos, who was at war with Mycenae. He was the brother of Chromius, Tyrannus, Antiochus, Chersidamas and Mestor.

Notes

References 

 Pseudo-Apollodorus, The Library with an English Translation by Sir James George Frazer, F.B.A., F.R.S. in 2 Volumes, Cambridge, MA, Harvard University Press; London, William Heinemann Ltd. 1921. . Online version at the Perseus Digital Library. Greek text available from the same website.

Arcadian characters in Greek mythology
Theban characters in Greek mythology
Arcadian mythology
Theban mythology